Peter (Petre) Stoica (born 1949) is a researcher and educator in the field of signal processing and its applications to radar/sonar, communications and bio-medicine. He is a professor of Signals and Systems Modeling at Uppsala University in Sweden, and a Member of the Royal Swedish Academy of Engineering Sciences, the United States National Academy of Engineering
(International Member), the Romanian Academy (Honorary Member), the European Academy of Sciences, and the Royal Society of Sciences. He is also a Fellow of IEEE, EURASIP, IETI, and the Royal Statistical Society.

He is known for his theoretical contributions to system identification and modeling, spectral analysis, array signal processing, space-time coding, and waveform design for active sensing. His practical contributions include the areas of wireless communications, microwave imaging for breast cancer detection, radar/sonar systems, acoustic source mapping, landmine and explosive detection, and magnetic resonance spectroscopy and imaging. His books on System Identification, Spectral Analysis, and Space-Time Coding for Wireless Communications have been used in both undergraduate and graduate courses and are highly cited (his works rank in the top 1% by citations for the field of engineering).
He has been included on the ISI list of the 250 most highly cited researchers in engineering in the world.

Selected awards 
 The IEEE ASSP Senior Award, 1989 
 Honorary doctorate from the Faculty of Science and Mathematics at Uppsala University, Sweden 1993
 The Shannon-Nyquist Technical Achievement Award of the IEEE Signal Processing Society, 1996 
 The IEEE W.R.G. Baker Award, 2000 
 The IEEE Third Millennium Medal, 2000
 The EURASIP Individual Technical Achievement Award, 2002 
 The Bjorkenska Prize, 2004
 The IEE Achievement Medal, 2005 
 The Wiener Society Award of the IEEE Signal Processing Society, 2006 
 The Barry Carlton Award of the IEEE Aerospace and Electronic Systems Society, 2008
 The IEEE Signal Processing Society Best Paper Award, 2013
 The EURASIP Athanasios Papoulis Award, 2016
 Rudbeck Gold Medal, 2016
The IEEE Fourier Award for Signal Processing, 2018
 The C.F. Gauss Education Award of the IEEE Signal Processing Society, 2019

Selected publications

(out of 800 scientific papers and 30 books and book chapters)

 T. Söderström and P. Stoica, System Identification. Prentice-Hall, London, United Kingdom, 1989 (Paperback Edition 1994, Polish Edition 1997, Chinese Edition 2017). 
 P. Stoica and R. Moses, Introduction to Spectral Analysis. Prentice-Hall, Englewood Cliffs, USA, 1997. available for download.
 P. Stoica and A. Nehorai, Music, Maximum likelihood and the Cramér-Rao bound. IEEE Trans. Acoustics, Speech, Signal Processing, vol. ASSP-37, 720–741, 1989.
 E Larsson and P Stoica,Space-Time Block Coding For Wireless Communications. Cambridge University Press, UK, 2003 (Chinese Edition, 2006).
 P Stoica and R Moses, Spectral Analysis of Signals. Prentice Hall, NJ, 2005 (Chinese Edition, 2007). available for download.
 H Sampath, P Stoica and A Paulraj, Generalized linear precoder and decoder design for MIMO channels using the weighted MMSE criterion. IEEE Trans Comm, vol 49, 2198–2206, 2001.
 A Scaglione, P Stoica, S Barbarossa, G Giannakis and H Sampath. Optimal designs for space-time linear precoders and decoders. IEEE Trans Signal Processing, vol 50, 1051–1064, 2002.
 J Li, P Stoica and Z Wang, On robust Capon beamforming and diagonal loading. IEEE Trans Signal Process, vol 51, 1702–1715, 2003.
 J Li and P Stoica, MIMO radar with colocated antennas: review of some recent work. IEEE Signal Processing Mag., 106–114, September, 2007.
 P. Stoica and A. Nehorai, Performance study of conditional and unconditional direction of arrival estimation. IEEE Trans. Acoust., Speech, Signal Process., vol. ASSP-38, 1783–1795, Oct. 1990.

Citation counts for the above publications can be found at: Google Scholar page.

References 

Fellow Members of the IEEE
Academic staff of Uppsala University
Electrical engineering academics
Swedish engineers
Members of the Royal Swedish Academy of Engineering Sciences
Members of the United States National Academy of Engineering
Systems scientists
Honorary members of the Romanian Academy
Probability theorists
Politehnica University of Bucharest alumni
Academic staff of the Politehnica University of Bucharest
Control theorists
1949 births
Living people